A Venetian door is a door that is flanked by two narrow sidelights, like a Venetian window.

References

Architectural elements